Kruis is a surname of primarily Dutch and Flemish origin. Notable people with the surname include:

Andrea Kruis (born 1962), Dutch comics artist
Deon Kruis (born 1974), South African cricketer
George Kruis (born 1990), British rugby union player
Jan Kruis (1933–2017), Dutch comics artist

See also
Zilveren Kruis, Dutch health insurance company